Siah Takan-e Pain (also Romanized as Sīāh Takān-e Pā’īn) is a village in Rahdar Rural District, in the Central District of Rudan County, Hormozgan Province, Iran. At the 2006 census, its population was 20, in 6 families.

References 

Populated places in Rudan County